Edmonton Fire Rescue Services (also Edmonton Fire and Rescue Services) is the fire department for the city of Edmonton, Alberta, Canada.

The Edmonton Fire Department began as a volunteer fire corps in 1891 and the first full department was created in 1906.

Operations

There are 30 stations throughout the city.

Organization, ranks, shifts and staffing 

Fire Chief:  Joe Zatylny 

Deputy Chief, Operations:  Brad Kitiuk

Deputy Chief, Training and Logistics - Tiffany Edgecombe

Deputy Chief, Fire Technical Services:  Bryan Singleton

Deputy Fire Chief, Planning & the Office of Emergency Management:  Rob Squire

Deputy Chief, Public Safety: Robert McAdam

The City is divided into five districts, each supervised by a District Chief. A Platoon Chief is in

charge of each platoon (shift). Four platoons work two shifts on a rotating basis that averages 42 hours per week.

The shift pattern as of 2016 was: two 10-hour days – two 14 hours nights – two days off;  two 10-hour days – two 14 hour nights – six days off.

Each station has a station captain who is usually assigned to the pump in the station; the exception is Station 21, which does not have a pump. Other than Rescue 21, all ladders, rescues, tankers and haz-mat rigs are assigned a fire captain.

Under the Fire Rescue Master Plan all Pumps (engine companies) are staffed with four firefighters as are Ladders (truck companies) and Rescues (exception of Rescue 21).  Tenders/tankers are staffed with a 
minimum of 2 firefighters. Stations with a single Pump were to be staffed with five firefighters.  Hazmat 1 is staffed with a minimum of five, Hazmat 2 is cross staffed with the crew of Pump 10, Hazmat 3 is cross staffed with the crew of Ladder 10. ATP's are staffed with members assigned to the Ladder in their respective station, if the ATP is called the Ladder goes out of service. Mobile Command 1 is staffed by Rescue 21 and when called Rescue 21 will go to 4 members. The boat is also cross staffed by the crew of Rescue 21
In late August 2019 all Pumps were reduced to four firefighters in order to establish two additional Pump units in the downtown area. Located at stations 1 and 5 and identified with the "A" suffix, this triggered a reassignment of units at downtown stations (1,2,5,22).

Past Fire Chiefs 
Ken Block (1 February 2009- 3 February 2020)
Randy Wolsey (September 2001 - April 2009)

Fleet

EFRS had 158 assets in its fleet as of 2021. 

 47 Pumps (including 11 in reserve and one being considered for disposal)
 8 Tankers
 13 Ladders
 13 rescue trucks (including one in reserve)
 3 rescue boats
 16 specialty vehicles (including two in reserve)
 43 light vehicles (including 10 in reserve and one being considered for disposal)
 15 trailers (including two in reserve)

See also
Edmonton Police Service

References

External links

Edmonton Fire Rescue Services (official site)
Edmonton Firefighter's 

Fire departments in Alberta
Municipal government of Edmonton